"Cómo Te Extraño Corazón" (English: How I miss you darling [lit. "my heart"]) is the fifth and last radio single and eleventh track from Maná's fifth studio album, Sueños Líquidos in 1997. On the week of November 28, 1998, the song debuted, peaking at number 31 on the U.S. Billboard Hot Latin Tracks. It stayed for a total of two weeks.

Charts

References

1998 singles
Maná songs
Spanish-language songs
Songs written by Fher Olvera
Warner Music Latina singles
1997 songs